The Athens Tram is the modern public tram network system serving Athens, Greece. The system is owned and operated by STASY, which replaced Tram S.A. in June 2011.

STASY operates a fleet of 25 Alstom Citadis and 35 Sirio vehicles, which serve two tram lines and 60 stops. The tram network spans a total length of  throughout ten Athenian suburbs. This network runs from Syntagma (central Athens) to the coastal suburb of Palaio Faliro, where the line splits in two branches: the first runs along the Athens coastline toward the southern suburb of Voula, while the other heads toward the port of Piraeus. The network covers the majority of the city's Saronic Gulf coastline. Athens' tram system provides average daily service to 65,000 passengers, and employs 345 people.

History

Old tram networks (1908-1960)

Athens Tram began its operations in 1882 with horse tramways. After 1908, the metre gauge tram network was electrified and was extended to 21 lines. The original Athens tram system ceased operations in 1960 and was replaced by trolleybuses and motorbuses. A standard gauge tram system was built along the perimeter of Piraeus Harbour by the Hellenic Electric Railways.

Modern tram system
In March 2001, Tram S.A. was established as a public utility company under the supervision of the Ministry of Transport and Communications, as a subsidiary company of Attiko Metro S.A., the state company which developed the Athens Metro network. The company started the construction of the initial network in the beginning of 2002, and was opened by Michalis Liapis (Minister for Transport and Communications) on 19 July 2004, a few weeks prior to the 2004 Summer Olympics in Athens. The construction of the tram network was financed by the Third European Regional Development Fund and Greek state funds.

In March 2011, the Greek Government passed Law 3920 to allow ISAP and Tram S.A. to be absorbed by AMEL. The resulting company was renamed STASY S.A. and is a subsidiary of OASA S.A. The merger was officially announced on June 10, 2011.

Extensions 

From 28 November 2019, trams heading towards Faliro terminated at  instead of Stadio Irinis & Filias, before running out of service towards Akti Poseidonos. The final terminus of the extension, Akti Poseidonos, is not yet open .

Ticketing policy

Ticket counters and automatic ticket machines with touch screens are available in some of the stations.

Purchased tickets are valid for 90 minutes (1 hour 30 minutes) after validation and can be used for several rides for all means of public transport in Athens including the metro, buses, and the urban part of the suburban railway (between Piraeus, Magoula and Koropi stations, excluding the airport). Passengers must validate their tickets at the electronic validating machines inside the tram vehicle at the start of their ride. The normal adult flat fare is €1.20 (valid for 90 minutes).

There are daily and weekly tickets, as well as monthly cards which also apply for all means of public transport in Athens. Fares are checked frequently; passengers who fail to show a validated ticket or a monthly card are penalized by a fine of 60 times the price of a standard ticket.

Children under 6, the handicapped, and persons currently enlisted in the military are eligible for free transportation.

Network

Current routes 

The Athens Tram currently consists two routes, Lines 6 and 7:
 Line 6 starts at Syntagma Square in Central Athens, and runs south west towards the coast, before turning south east at the junction of Poseidonos Avenue and Achilleos towards Pikrodafni in Kalamaki.
 Line 7 starts at Asklepieio Voulas in Voula, running north west along the coast towards Agia Triada in Piraeus, operating in a one-way loop west of Neo Faliro.

Lines 6 and 7 (also known occasionally as T6 and T7 respectively) were introduced on 6 December 2021, replacing Lines 3, 4 and 5. The two lines share tram tracks from Pikrodafni to the junction of Poseidonos Avenue and Achilleos.

Former routes 

The present Athens Tram opened with five lines, which were named after ancient Greeks: Aristophanes (Line 1), Aeschylus (Line 2), Thucydides (Line 3), Aristotle (Line 4), and Plato (Line 5). Line 3 ran between Stadio Irinis & Filias (SEF) and Kolymvitirio, Line 4 ran between Syntagma and SEF, and Line 5 ran between Syntagma and Kolymvitirio. Lines 1 and 2 were shortened versions of Lines 4 and 5 respectively, terminating at Leoforos Vouliagmenis instead of Syntagma: Lines 1 and 2 were discontinued in early-2005.

Lines 3 and 5 were extended to Asklepieio Voulas on 15 November 2007. From 28 November 2019, westbound trams of Lines 3 and 4 terminated at  instead of Stadio Irinis & Filias.

Stops 

Since December 2021, the system consists of 59 tram stops: one additional stop,  on the western end of the Piraeus branch, is complete but not yet open. A majority of the stops are within the South and Central Athens regional units: thirteen are in Piraeus, and one is in Voula.

Rolling stock
The Athens Tram opened in 2004 with 35 Sirio trams from AnsaldoBreda. To support the extension of the system into the centre of Piraeus, an order was placed in July 2018 for 25 Alstom Citadis 305 trams, delivery of which began in September 2020 and will extend through May 2021.

See also 
 Athens Mass Transit System
 Piraeus-Perama light railway
 Railway Museum of Athens
 List of rapid transit systems

Notes

References

External links

Urban Rail Transport S.A.: Tramway 
Athens Urban Transport Organisation (OASA) 
UrbanRail.Net - Athens Tram
Network map (real distance)

 
Electric railways in Greece
Athens
750 V DC railway electrification